Langeskov is a town in central Denmark, with a population of 4,222 (1 January 2022), located in Kerteminde Municipality in Region of Southern Denmark on the island of Funen.

The town of Langeskov is primarily located in Rønninge parish and was established following the construction of the railway line between Odense and Nyborg in the 19th century. The town has grown rapidly and its northern part now crosses the old parish border and extends into the parish of Birkende. Until 1 January 2007, it was the seat of the municipal council of the now former Langeskov Municipality.

Langeskov has a model of Preikestolen to commemorate its twin town, Forsand.

Demographics

Notable people 
 Lars Arendt-Nielsen (born 1958 in Langeskov) a professor at Aalborg University, specialising in translational pain research
 Mathias Greve (born 1995 in Langeskov) a Danish footballer, 137 caps with Odense Boldklub

External links
Langeskov municipality
LangeskovNET - Langeskov business listing

References

Cities and towns in the Region of Southern Denmark
Populated places in Funen
Kerteminde Municipality

no:Langeskov